The 2022 United States Senate election in Wisconsin was held on November 8, 2022, to elect a member of the United States Senate from Wisconsin. The party primaries were held on August 9, 2022. Incumbent Republican Senator Ron Johnson won re-election to a third term, defeating the Democratic nominee, Lieutenant Governor Mandela Barnes.

In 2016, Johnson pledged to serve only two terms but reversed this decision in 2022. The race was one of the most competitive of the cycle, after considerable Democratic success in recent statewide elections: in 2018, when Democrats won every statewide contest on the ballot, including the state's other Senate seat; and 2020, in which Democrat Joe Biden narrowly carried the state.

Johnson led in most polls in the final weeks, leading by over 3% in polling average. However, Johnson won by just one percentage point, or 26,718 votes. This was the closest of his three victories, as well as the closest Wisconsin Senate contest since 1914, and the second-closest Senate contest of the 2022 cycle. This was also the first Senate election in the state since 1998 in which the winning candidate was of a different party than the winner of the state's concurrent gubernatorial election.

With his victory, Johnson became the first Republican to win a third term as Senator from Wisconsin since Alexander Wiley in 1950, and the first to win more than two terms since 1956.

Republican primary

Candidates

Nominee
 Ron Johnson, incumbent U.S. Senator

Eliminated in primary
 David Schroeder, former educator

Disqualified
Keith Neubert, paramedic
Brad Beyer, U.S. Army veteran

Withdrawn
John Berman, electronic hardware designer, test engineer and candidate for U.S. Senate (Minnesota and Kansas) in 2020

Declined
David Beth, Kenosha County sheriff
 Sean Duffy, former U.S. Representative from 
Eric Hovde, candidate for U.S. Senate in 2012
 Rebecca Kleefisch, former Lieutenant Governor of Wisconsin (running for governor; endorsed Johnson)
 Kevin Nicholson, businessman, former member of the Wisconsin Board of Veterans Affairs, and candidate for U.S. Senate in 2018 (running for governor)
 Scott Walker, former Governor of Wisconsin

Endorsements

Results

Democratic primary

Candidates

Nominee
Mandela Barnes, Lieutenant Governor of Wisconsin

Eliminated in primary
Kou Lee, restaurant owner
Adam Murphy, business owner
Steven Olikara, founder and CEO of Millennial Action Project
Peter Peckarsky, attorney and candidate for Chair of the Democratic National Committee in 2017
Darrell Williams, Wisconsin Emergency Management administrator

Did not file
Chantia Lewis, Milwaukee Common Councillor

Withdrew
Gillian Battino, radiologist (running for state treasurer)
Sarah Godlewski, State Treasurer of Wisconsin (endorsed Barnes)
Chris Larson, state senator from the 7th district (endorsed Barnes)
Alex Lasry, senior vice president of the Milwaukee Bucks and former intern in the Obama administration (endorsed Barnes)
Jeff Rumbaugh, disability rights activist and candidate for governor in 2018 (endorsed Nelson)

Declined
Josh Kaul, Attorney General of Wisconsin (running for re-election)
Ron Kind, U.S. Representative from 
Tony Evers, Governor of Wisconsin (running for re-election)

Fundraising

Endorsements

Polling
Graphical summary

Results

General election

Predictions

Debates

Endorsements

Polling
Aggregate polls

Graphical summary

Ron Johnson vs. Sarah Godlewski

Ron Johnson vs. Alex Lasry

Ron Johnson vs. Tom Nelson

Results

Counties that flipped from Democratic to Republican
 Columbia (largest municipality: Portage)
 Crawford (largest municipality: Prairie du Chien)
 Lafayette (largest municipality: Darlington)
 Richland (largest municipality: Richland Center)
 Vernon (largest municipality: Viroqua)

See also 
 2022 United States Senate elections
 2022 Wisconsin elections

Notes

Partisan clients

References

External links
Official campaign websites
 Mandela Barnes (D) for Senate
 Ron Johnson (R) for Senate

2022
Wisconsin
United States Senate